On 4 June 2022, a major explosion and fire occurred at a chemical plant in Hapur, Uttar Pradesh, India. At least 9 people were killed and 19 others injured.

Details of the disaster 
The explosion took place on a Saturday afternoon at the Ruhi Industries  electronic equipment manufacturing unit where 33 people were working. The magnitude caused roofs to blow off houses, with sound travelling 10 km away. The factory was owned by Dilshad of Meerut, and had been leased to Wasim of Hapur. After the explosion, Wasim fled the scene after receiving medical treatment but was later arrested. A forensic science laboratory criminal investigation was launched initiated by Chief Minister Yogi Adityanath in order to determine the exact cause of the blast.

After further investigation 
Initial reports were of a burst boiler which had caused the explosion. However the subsequent suspected cause was gunpowder used to manufacture toy gun pellets, because police retrieved plastic pellets used in their manufacture from the scene. This was despite the factory's license obtained in 2021 to manufacture electronic equipment not toy guns.

Location 
The factory is located in Dhaluana, at the Uttar Pradesh State Industrial Development Corporation governed industrial district of Harpur, 60 Kilometers from New Delhi, the capital of India. Harpur coordinates:

Local response 
The local response was rapid. The Chief Minister announced a rescue and relief operation with victims to be supported. Firefighters attended for 3 hours to extinguish the fire, and forensics attended the scene to gather evidence. Prime Minister Narendra Modi offered his condolences to those affected, and the state government offered support for the treatment of victims.

Mortality and morbidity 
Initial reports were of 9 people dead and 19 injured. However, later reports confirmed13 killed and 20 injured. 11 of those who died came from the areas of Bahraich (Uttar Pradesh) and Bihar. Wasim, owner of the factory suffered burns and incurred stitches. Victims were taken to hospitals for medical care in Delhi, Noida, Ghaziabad and Meerut, including Safdarjung Hospital for optimal treatment.

Consequences 
The owner and operator of the factory were charged under Indian Penal Code sections 286, 287, 304, 308, 337 and 338. As a result, further investigations were carried out in neighboring factories to ensure licenses were correctly used.

See also
 2022 Sitakunda fire, on the same day
 List of explosions

References

2022 disasters in India
2022 fires in Asia
2022 industrial disasters
2020s in Uttar Pradesh
Chemical plant explosions
Disasters in Uttar Pradesh
Explosions in 2022
Chemical plant explosion
Industrial fires and explosions in India
June 2022 events in India
Man-made disasters in India